2005 The National was held November 2–6, 2005, at the Port Hawkesbury Civic Centre in Port Hawkesbury, Nova Scotia. The total purse of the event was $100,000. It was the first (men's) Grand Slam event of the 2005-06 curling season.

Ontario's Wayne Middaugh rink defeated Saskatchewan's Pat Simmons team. It was Middaugh's third outright victory in four tournaments up to that point in the season. Middaugh's win gave him a career Grand Slam, and his team took home $28,000 for the win. Team Simmons took home $16,000, with semifinalists Randy Ferbey of Edmonton and Ontario's Glenn Howard winning $12,000 each.

The semifinals and finals were broadcast on Sportsnet.

Teams
The teams were as follows:

Draw
The event was a triple knock out.

Playoffs
The scores for the playoffs were as follows.

References

External links

The National, 2005
The National (curling)
2005 in Nova Scotia
Inverness County, Nova Scotia
Curling competitions in Nova Scotia
November 2005 sports events in Canada